Eric Olsen (born June 16, 1988) is a former American football offensive guard. He was drafted by the Denver Broncos in sixth round of the 2010 NFL Draft. He played collegiately for the Notre Dame Fighting Irish.  He has also been a member of the Washington Redskins, Pittsburgh Steelers, and New Orleans Saints.

Early years

Olsen attended Poly Prep Country Day School in Brooklyn, New York, where he was both an offensive tackle as well as a defensive end. At offensive tackle, he was never charged with a sack to his quarterback. As a defensive end, he recorded 53 tackles, 8 sacks and forced 3 fumbles.

College career
Olsen played in 44 games during his four years at the University of Notre Dame. He started the last 31 of those games. During his junior and senior years combined he only allowed four quarterbacks sacks.

He was also a member of the first Seligman fraternity pledge class at Amherst College in Massachusetts. Olsen continues to be an active brother and attends annual Seligmania events.

Professional career

Denver Broncos
Olsen was projected to be drafted in the fifth or sixth round during the 2010 NFL Draft. He was one of the top performers at the bench press, vertical jump and the 3-cone drill. Olsen was drafted by the Denver Broncos in the sixth round (183rd overall). He was expected to compete with J. D. Walton for the starting center job for the Broncos. He was waived by the Broncos September 3, 2011.

Washington Redskins
Olsen spent the 2011 season on Washington's practice squad.

New Orleans Saints
With the New Orleans Saints heading into the 2011 playoffs, the team signed Olsen off the Redskins' practice squad on January 2, 2012. He was inactive in both of the Saints' games in the playoffs.

He remained with New Orleans for the 2012 season, playing in all 16 games and starting 4 as a blocking tight end. In 2013 was placed on injured reserve during training camp, and later released.

Pittsburgh Steelers
He signed with the Steelers but did not play during the regular season.

Tennessee Titans
On April 3, 2014, Olsen signed with the Tennessee Titans, but he was released at the end of training camp.

Second stint with Saints
The Saints brought Olsen back for a second stint with the team on October 22, 2014. He was expected to provide additional depth on the line after an injury to Jonathan Goodwin meant that backup center Tim Lelito would be starting. He was released on November 12, 2014.

Second stint with Titans
Olsen returned to the Titans after they signed him on November 25, 2014.

Cleveland Browns

The Cleveland Browns signed Olsen on May 26, 2015. On September 5, 2015, he was released by the Browns.

Personal life
Olsen has one brother, Drew, a former safety at Gettysburg College. His father, Andy Olsen, was a New York City firefighter. Just three days before the 9/11 attacks, his father was promoted to Lieutenant. Therefore, he was in officer training on September 11, and not with Ladder 80, his firehouse at the time. When his father finally arrived at the World Trade Center site, both towers had already collapsed. A few days later, when he was digging through the rubble, his father found a truck from his firehouse buried and destroyed. None of the firefighters in that particular unit survived .

References

External links

New Orleans Saints bio
Tennessee Titans bio

1988 births
Living people
Players of American football from New York (state)
American football centers
American football offensive guards
Notre Dame Fighting Irish football players
Denver Broncos players
Washington Redskins players
New Orleans Saints players
Pittsburgh Steelers players
Tennessee Titans players
Cleveland Browns players
Poly Prep alumni